Key party may refer to:

 Key party, a type of swinging event
 Key signing party, an event at which people present cryptographic keys to others in person for identity verification
 Key Party Records, a Japanese record label founded in 1997
 "Key Party" (Will & Grace), a 2004 television series episode
 “The Key” Episode from “Cold Case” season 4 episode 7
 "Key Party", a 2020 episode of Betty
 The Key Party, a website created to promote the 2013 video game Poker Night 2